The Jewish Cemetery is a cemetery for the Paradesi Jews of Chennai, India. It is located off Lloyd's Road. The cemetery remains the only memoir of the once significant Jewish population of Chennai, which has now almost become extinct. Burials include the tombstones of 18th-century Jewish diamond merchants. The cemetery houses fewer than 30 graves, of which a handful are almost 300 years old. 

The cemetery is located on a poor market area of the road west of the Marina Fish Market and is adjacent to Baháʼí Faith and Chinese cemeteries. Among the graves is that of Victoria 'Toyah' Sofaer, from an elite Baghdadi family, who died in what was then Madras in 1943 - the story of her life and tragically young death was investigated by the BBC.

The cemetery formerly used to have an iron gate on which a plaque was attached on which a Star of David and the words "Jewish Cemetery" were inscribed. After the renovation around 2016, these doors were replaced with sturdier ones. Before the renovation, the cemetery had been reported to be in a state of severe disrepair – with rusted iron gates, partially grown shrubs ,and cracked walls. People in the surrounding area were oblivious to the existence and historical importance of the cemetery. As of 2016, it had few visitors.

History

1500 The first Jewish Cemetery   was built by Amsterdam Sephardic community in Coral Merchant Street, George Town, Madras, which had a large presence of Portuguese Jews in the seventeenth and eighteenth centuries. Neither the synagogue nor the Jewish population remains today.

1644 The Second Jewish Cemetery was built by Jacques (Jaime) de Paiva (Pavia) also from Amsterdam Sephardic community, in Peddanaickenpet, which later became the South end of Mint Street,

1687  Jacques (Jaime) de Paiva (Pavia) was buried in the cemetery upon his death in 1687.

5 June 1968 Local government fully demolished The Second Jewish Cemetery and took over the land for building a government school, hence Rabbi Levi Salomon (the last rabbi of Madras synagogue) died of a heart attack. The remaining tombstones were moved opposite to Kasimedu  cemetery.

29 December 1983  The tombstones from Central Park of Madras and opposite to Kasimedu cemetery were moved to Lloyds Road, when the Chennai Harbour expansion project was approved. In this whole process 17 tombstones went missing, including that of Jacques (Jaime) de Paiva (Pavia).

The cemetery is under the care of the Isaac and Rosa Charitable Trust, Henriques De Castro family.

2012 Two walls of the cemetery came down during the Cyclone Nilam. The cost for repair was projected to be $2070.

2016 The cemetery had been renovated by Isaac and Rosa Charitable Trust, Henriques De Castro family, and the walls were re-erected. The walls were painted blue and raised to avoid trespassers and dog menace.

Image gallery

References

Cemeteries in India
Jews and Judaism in India
Jewish cemeteries
Monuments and memorials in Chennai
Paradesi Jews